The Gunnison Gorge Wilderness is a U.S. Wilderness Area located immediately northwest of the Black Canyon of the Gunnison National Park.  The  wilderness area established in 1999 includes  of the Gunnison River inside the Gunnison Gorge National Conservation Area.

References

Wilderness areas of Colorado
Gunnison River
Protected areas of Montrose County, Colorado
Protected areas of Delta County, Colorado
Protected areas established in 1999
Bureau of Land Management areas in Colorado
1999 establishments in Colorado